Cognettia is a genus of annelids belonging to the family Enchytraeidae.

The genus has almost cosmopolitan distribution.

Species:
 Cognettia alsoae (Martinsson, Klinth & Erséus, 2018) 
 Cognettia baekrokdamensis (Dózsa-Farkas, Felföldi, Nagy & Hong, 2018)

References

Annelids